Offworld is a Spanish television series based on the apocalyptic podcast El gran apagón. The 5-part series tracks 5 independent stories of people dealing with a apocalyptic situation in the wake of a solar storm. A Movistar Plus+ original, it is directed by Rodrigo Sorogoyen, Raúl Arévalo, Isa Campo, Alberto Rodríguez and Isaki Lacuesta.

Plot 
Focused on Spain, the plot the mishaps of different characters in the wake of a solar storm, adapting to a planet lacking much of the technology that was previously available.

Cast

Production 
The series is based on the podcast El gran apagón, and it is a Buendía Estudios production. The 5 episodes were directed by Rodrigo Sorogoyen, Raúl Arévalo, Isa Campo, Alberto Rodríguez and Isaki Lacuesta. Shooting locations included Madrid, and the provinces of Toledo, Segovia, Guadalajara, and Ciudad Real.

Release 
The series premiered in September 2022 at the 70th San Sebastián International Film Festival as part of the festival's official selection (screened out of competition). Movistar Plus+ released the series on 29 September 2022.

Episodes

Accolades 

|-
| rowspan = "3" align = "center" | 2022 || rowspan = "3" | 28th Forqué Awards || colspan = "2" | Best TV Series ||  || rowspan = "3" | 
|-
| rowspan = "2" | Best TV Actor || Jesús Carroza || 
|-
| Luis Callejo ||  
|-
| rowspan = "5" align = "center" | 2023 || rowspan = "4" | 10th Feroz Awards || colspan = "2" | Best Drama Series ||  || rowspan = "4" | 
|-
| Best Actor in a TV Series || Luis Callejo || 
|-
| Best Supporting Actor in a TV Series || Jesús Carroza || 
|-
| Best Screenplay in a TV Series || Isabel Peña, Alberto Marini, Fran Araújo, Rafael Cobos, Isa Campo || 
|-
| 31st Actors and Actresses Union Awards || Best Television Actor in a Leading Role || Luis Callejo ||  || 
|}

References 

Spanish science fiction television series
Television shows set in Spain
Television shows filmed in Spain
Spanish-language television shows
2022 Spanish television series debuts
Movistar+ original programming
Television shows based on podcasts
Post-apocalyptic television series
2020s Spanish drama television series